The 1981 UK & Ireland Greyhound Racing Year was the 55th year of greyhound racing in the United Kingdom and Ireland.

Roll of honour

Summary
The National Greyhound Racing Club (NGRC) released the annual returns, with totalisator turnover down 10%, at £72,950,373 and attendances down 10%, recorded at 4,943,396 from 5291 meetings. Attendances had decreased significantly for the second year running, although party due to 200 less meetings it was a worrying time for the industry. Track tote retention remained 17% and government tote tax 4%.

Decoy Boom, a fawn bitch was voted Greyhound of the Year. She won the BBC TV Trophy, GRA Stakes, Scottish Marathon, Stow Marathon and Longcross Cup.

Tracks
Chesterton Greyhound Stadium and Maidstone joined the NGRC permit scheme. Two independents opened 
Brownhills and Skegness.

News
Tim Hale and Derek Bowman replaced Racing Manager Harry Bridger at Leeds; the track owners Ladbrokes later announced the site would be used for industrial development in the near future. 

Towards the end of the year the country suffered terrible weather and the majority of the horse racing fixtures were cancelled. This meant that extra afternoon race meetings were organised to help the betting shops. Extra fixtures were organised by Hackney, Bristol, Monmore, Cambridge, Romford and Crayford. This provided an opportunity for tracks to negotiate a better deal for the future to combat the drop in attendances blamed on the betting shops, however they failed to do so preferring to take short term cash benefits instead.  

The Greyhound Racing Association (GRA) announced that they had repaid two thirds of their debt. The business was doing well from its greyhound racing income which begged the question as to how the company allowed themselves to get into such debt in the first place. 

Leading trainer Pat Mullins died in March after collapsing whilst working at his kennels in Manningtree. He had suffered a heart attack the previous year and had been warned by doctors to avoid stress. His wife Linda Mullins would take over the kennels.   The leading independent trainer Charlie Lister took out an NGRC licence and would soon gain some success, his first breakthrough was with Swift Band, who won the 1981 East Anglian Derby.

Competitions
Marbella Sky won the Scottish Greyhound Derby at Shawfield Stadium, and later finished runner up in the Edinburgh Cup at Powderhall Stadium. The greyhound (still a puppy) faced an exciting future but was then stolen from the Wakefield kennels of his trainer Ray Andrews. He was never recovered.

A new major event was inaugurated at Wembley called the Blue Riband and would replace the long running Wembley Spring Cup which had been one of the first major competitions in the greyhound racing calendar. The Grand National at White City went to Bobcol trained by Norah McEllistrim; the black dog had already won the Springbok crown the previous year. The hurdler went on to score a hat-trick when travelling to Powderhall and winning the Scottish Grand National.

Lauries Panther, a black and white dog, whelped in April, 1980 by Shamrock Sailor out of Lady Lucy, was owned by Laurie James and trained at Romford by Terry Duggan and appeared on the racing scene in the Bobby Jack Puppy Cup run at Wimbledon Stadium in November, followed by the Christmas Puppy Cup at Romford. He performed well and would be aimed at the Pall Mall Stakes the following year.  

Oran Jack twice broke the Irish national 550 yards record on his way to winning the Irish St Leger at Limerick. The fawn dog trained by husband and wife team Michael and Rose Grealish recorded 30.20 and 30.16 in the second round and semi finals respectively, before winning the final.

Principal UK races

Principal Irish finals

Totalisator returns

The totalisator returns declared to the National Greyhound Racing Club for the year 1981 are listed below.

References 

Greyhound racing in the United Kingdom
Greyhound racing in the Republic of Ireland
UK and Ireland Greyhound Racing Year
UK and Ireland Greyhound Racing Year
UK and Ireland Greyhound Racing Year
UK and Ireland Greyhound Racing Year